The effects of Hurricane Katrina in Florida were in both the southern portion of the state and in the panhandle. After developing on August 23, Katrina made landfall near the border of Broward and Miami-Dade counties with  winds on August 25. While it was crossing the state, the hurricane's convection was asymmetrical, primarily located to the south and east of the center. The rains caused flooding, and the combination of rains and winds downed trees and power lines, leaving 1.45 million people without power. Damage in South Florida was estimated at $523 million (2005 USD), mostly as a result of crop damage. Further south, the hurricane spawned a tornado in the Florida Keys. In the island chain, Katrina caused heavy rainfall and gusty winds.

After emerging from the state, Katrina intensified into one of the strongest Atlantic hurricanes, becoming a Category 5 on the Saffir–Simpson scale. It moved ashore in Louisiana and Mississippi, although the hurricane's outer periphery produced a  storm surge in Pensacola along the panhandle. High waves caused beach erosion and closed nearby roadways. There were five tornadoes in northwestern Florida. Damage was estimated along the panhandle at $100 million. Throughout the state, the hurricane killed 14 people, of which 6 were directly related to the storm's effects. Due to damage from Katrina, 11 Florida counties were declared federal disaster areas.

Background

Hurricane Katrina developed as Tropical Depression Twelve over the Bahamas on August 23, partially from the remains of Tropical Depression Ten. As it moved slowly northwestward, it developed organized convection, or thunderstorms, and it intensified into a tropical storm on August 24. A building ridge turned Katrina to the west, bringing it over the Gulf Stream. With warm waters and favorable outflow, the storm continued strengthening. At around 2100 UTC on August 25, Katrina attained hurricane status, based on observations from the Hurricane Hunters. Intensification of the ridge to its north caused the hurricane to turn to the west-southwest, and as it approached the Florida coastline Katrina developed a well-defined eye. The hurricane moved southwestward and crossed Florida in about six hours, during which its eye became better defined over the warm and shallow waters of the Everglades. During its passage, northerly wind shear shifted the deepest convection to the south and east of the center, and Katrina briefly weakened to a tropical storm before emerging into the Gulf of Mexico early on August 26. After emerging from the state, Katrina intensified into one of the strongest Atlantic hurricanes, becoming a Category 5 on the Saffir–Simpson scale. Katrina ultimately moved ashore in southeastern Louisiana on August 29, where it caused severe storm surge flooding and catastrophic damage; it dissipated the following day.

In the preceding 2004 season, Florida was affected by four hurricanes, including hurricanes Frances and Jeanne which hit Martin County and caused billions in damage.

Preparations

About nine hours after the system developed on August 24, the National Hurricane Center (NHC) issued a tropical storm watch from the Seven Mile Bridge to Vero Beach. Later that day, the watch was upgraded to a tropical storm warning and hurricane watch from Florida City to Vero Beach after the storm's intensification became apparent. About 25 hours before Katrina made landfall, the tropical storm watch was extended northward to Titusville, and a tropical storm warning and a hurricane watch was issued for Lake Okeechobee. Early on August 25, a hurricane warning was issued from Florida City to Vero Beach and for Lake Okeechobee. In southeastern Florida, the lead time for the hurricane watch and warning occurred 31.5 and 19.5 hours before landfall, respectively; both were 16.5 hours less than the desired lead time. A tropical storm warning was also issued from Florida Key, southward through the Florida Keys to the Dry Tortugas, and northward along the western coast to Longboat Key. The warning in the Florida Keys occurred only nine hours before the onset of tropical storm force winds.

On August 25, Florida's Emergency Operations Center was activated in Tallahassee to monitor the progress of the hurricane. Before Katrina moved ashore, schools and businesses were closed in the Miami area. Cruise ships altered their paths due to seaports in southeastern Florida closing. Officials in Miami-Dade County advised residents in mobile homes or with special needs to evacuate. To the north in Broward County, residents east of the Intracoastal Waterway or in mobile homes were advised to leave their homes. Evacuation orders were issued for offshore islands in Palm Beach County, and for residents in mobile homes south of Lantana Road. Shelters were opened across the region. Officials closed the Miami International Airport, Fort Lauderdale – Hollywood International Airport, Key West International Airport, and Florida Keys Marathon Airport due to the storm. In Monroe and Collier counties, schools were closed, and a shelter was opened in Immokalee.

While Katrina was intensifying as a major hurricane on August 28, the NHC issued a tropical storm warning and hurricane watch from the Alabama border to Destin along the panhandle. The warning was later extended to Indian Pass. Officials issued a mandatory evacuation for portions of Walton, Gulf, Franklin, and Wakulla counties.

Impact
Overall, Hurricane Katrina killed 14 people in the state, of which 6 were directly related to the storm. Six of the indirect deaths were in South Florida, of which three were from carbon monoxide poisoning caused by generators, one was due to a vehicle accident, one occurred during debris cleanup, and one was associated with a lack of electricity. At least five people were injured due to carbon monoxide poisoning. Overall damage totaled $623 million (2005 USD).

Miami area

While moving across Florida, Katrina had an asymmetric area of thunderstorms, which placed the strongest winds and rainfall over Miami-Dade County. Of the total,  fell in 24 hours. Unofficially, wind gusts reached  at Homestead General Aviation Airport. Consequentially, there was minor beach erosion and isolated coastal flooding.

The heavy rainfall flooded neighborhoods in the area, damaging over 100 houses. The storm left about 1.4 million people without power in Palm Beach, Broward, and Miami-Dade counties. Downed trees killed three people in the county. Train and bus service was disrupted in the Miami area. Property damage was estimated at $100 million. Widespread flooding affected crop nurseries and greenhouses, and crop damage totaled $423 million. Three people drowned in Miami-Dade County, two of whom on boats.

Florida Keys and Monroe County
Katrina weakened into a tropical storm while moving across Monroe County. Tides reached  in mainland Monroe County, which flooded several houses and vehicles in Flamingo in Everglades National Park. Most of the Florida Keys reported tropical storm-force winds. The storm's outer rainbands spawned an F2 tornado in Marathon on August 26, which damaged an airport hangar and several homes. This was one of only six F2 tornadoes in the Florida Keys since 1950. Similar to the Miami area, Katrina dropped heavy rainfall in the Florida Keys, reaching  in Key West. In the area, the storm left about 5,000 people without power.

Elsewhere in Florida
Light rains and winds spread into the Melbourne National Weather Service region. In the central portion of the state, some areas for pasture were flooded due to outer rainbands.

Florida panhandle

The hurricane struck months after Hurricane Dennis affected the same area. In St. Marks, the surge flooded several businesses, and in Walton County, high tides flooded several roads, including portions of U.S. Highways 98 and 331. The storm caused moderate to severe beach erosion along the gulf coast, and washed sand onto many coastal roads. High winds briefly closed the Interstate 10 bridge over Escambia Bay in Pensacola. The outer rainbands of the hurricane spawned five tornadoes, all of them weak and not very damaging. Rainfall along the panhandle reached  in Philpot, which caused flooding.

The winds caused damage to some trees and structures and there was some minor flooding in the panhandle. There were two indirect fatalities from Katrina in Walton County as a result of a traffic accident. Along the Florida panhandle, 77,000 customers lost power. Damage along the panhandle was estimated at $100 million.

Aftermath
On August 28, or about three days after Katrina struck the state, President George W. Bush declared a disaster area for Miami-Dade and Broward counties, which allocated federal funding for debris removal and other emergency services. Three days later, Monroe County was also declared a disaster area, and on the same day the three counties were designated to receive funding for public assistance; this included aid to repair roads and bridges, water control facilities, public buildings, and recreation areas. The declaration was determined after the Federal Emergency Management Agency (FEMA) sent 20 State Emergency Response Teams to determine the extent of damage. After Hurricane Katrina struck the Gulf Coast, President Bush declared a disaster area for seven counties along the Florida panhandle on September 6; the counties were Bay, Escambia, Franklin, Gulf, Okaloosa, Santa Rosa, and Walton. In addition, Collier County in southwestern Florida was added to the list of disaster areas.

In the two months after Katrina struck south Florida, Hurricane Rita brushed the region in late September with tropical storm-force winds and flooding rains. In late October, Hurricane Wilma struck southwestern Florida as a major hurricane, affecting the Miami area with hurricane-force winds that left 98% of south Florida without power. Including Hurricane Dennis in July, FEMA provided $1 billion in public assistance to Florida residents in association with the four hurricanes in 2005.

References

Effects of Hurricane Katrina
Hurricanes in Florida
2005 in Florida
Katrina Florida